NTSS can refer to:
National Talent Search Examination
New Toronto Secondary School, a secondary school in Ontario, Canada
New Town Secondary School, a secondary school in Dover, Singapore
Northern Territory Space School